Chikubayama Masakuni (born August 21, 1957 as Makoto Tazaki) is a former sumo wrestler from Ukiha, Fukuoka, Japan. He made his professional debut in 1973, breaking into the top makuuchi division thirteen years later in 1986. His highest rank was maegashira 13. After retiring in 1989 he became an elder of the Japan Sumo Association. He was the head coach of the Miyagino stable and his most successful wrestler is yokozuna Hakuhō.

Career
He did sumo from a young age but played baseball at junior high school as there was no sumo team available. He joined Miyagino stable after graduation. His ring name (shikona) was named after former yokozuna Yoshibayama, his stablemaster, and it also references Chikugo, Fukuoka. His active career was relatively modest. He made his professional debut in March 1973 (alongside future sekiwake Kōbōyama), using his real name of Tazaki as his shikona. In March 1974 upon promotion to the sandanme division he became Chikubayama. He first reached sekitori status in November 1978 when he was promoted to the jūryō division but he lasted only one tournament, falling back to the unsalaried ranks. It took over four years, until January 1983, for him to win promotion back to jūryō and again he had a losing record and was demoted after only one tournament. After regular and intense training sessions with top division wrestler Kaiki of the Tomozuna stable he won promotion for the third time in March 1984, and finally established himself in  jūryō. However he did not reach the top makuuchi division until September 1986, 81 tournaments after his professional debut  – the second slowest ever at the time. He spent only two tournaments in the top division, peaking at maegashira 13.

Retirement from sumo
He retired from being an active wrestler in January 1989 and became an elder of the Japan Sumo Association under the name Nakagawa. However, following the sudden death in June of the same year of the head of the Miyagino stable (the former Hirokawa) he became the Miyagino stablemaster. The first sekitori he produced was Kengaku in 1991, followed by Wakahayato in 1994 and Kōbō in 1999. In December 2000 he recruited future yokozuna Hakuhō, after making a promise to then maegashira Kyokushūzan of the affiliated Ōshima stable, who had invited his fellow Mongolian to Japan for trials. No other stable would take Hakuhō, as he weighed just . at the time. However, after making his debut in March 2001 at the age of 16, Hakuhō trained hard and gained weight and muscle, and reached jūryō in January 2004.

He was forced to give up the Miyagino name and head coach position in August 2004 when it was acquired by the former Kanechika (he had apparently only been renting it from the widow of the previous coach), but he remained in the stable under the name Kumagatani, and was still regarded as Hakuhō's mentor. In December 2010 he regained the Miyagino name and status of head coach after Kanechika was demoted by the Japan Sumo Association for being caught on tape discussing alleged match-fixing. Miyagino has also coached Ryūō, Ishiura and Enhō to the top division.

In April 2019 Miyagino was given a ten percent pay cut for three months by the Sumo Association, in response to Hakuhō's breach of etiquette on the final day of the March 2019 tournament, when he led a sanbon jime to mark the end of the Heisei era, despite the day's ceremonies not being completed.

In July 2022 the Sumo Association announced that, in light of Miyagino reaching 65 years of age, Magaki-oyakata (former yokozuna Hakuhō) and Chikubayama would be exchanging elder-stocks, with Hakuhō becoming the 13th Miyagino and becoming the stablemaster at the stable and Chikubayama becoming the 22nd Magaki. He has remained as a coach at Miyagino stable, in a consultancy role.

Fighting style
Chikubayama was a tsuki-oshi specialist who preferred pushing and thrusting techniques and did not like to fight on the mawashi or belt. He won most of his bouts by a straightforward oshi-dashi or push out.

Career record

See also
Glossary of sumo terms
List of past sumo wrestlers
List of sumo elders
List of sumo tournament second division champions

References

1957 births
Living people
Japanese sumo wrestlers
Sumo people from Fukuoka Prefecture
People from Ukiha, Fukuoka